In the 2016–17 season, Al Sadd SC is competing in the Qatar Stars League for the 44th season, as well as the Emir of Qatar Cup the Qatar Crown Prince Cup and the Champions League.

Squad list
Players and squad numbers last updated on 3 September 2021.Note: Flags indicate national team as has been defined under FIFA eligibility rules. Players may hold more than one non-FIFA nationality.

Competitions

Overview

{| class="wikitable" style="text-align: center"
|-
!rowspan=2|Competition
!colspan=8|Record
!rowspan=2|Started round
!rowspan=2|Final position / round
!rowspan=2|First match	
!rowspan=2|Last match
|-
!
!
!
!
!
!
!
!
|-
| Qatar Stars League

| Matchday 1
| style="background:silver;"| Runners–up
| 16 September 2016
| 15 April 2017
|-
| Emir of Qatar Cup

| Quarter-final 
| style="background:gold;"| Winners 
| 5 May 2017
| 19 May 2017
|-
| Qatar Crown Prince Cup

| Semi-finals 
| style="background:gold;"| Winners
| 20 April 2017
| 29 April 2017
|-
| Champions League

| colspan=2| Play-off round 
| colspan=2| 7 February 2017
|-
! Total

Qatar Stars League

League table

Results summary

Results by round

Matches

Emir of Qatar Cup

Qatar Cup (ex) Crown Prince Cup

AFC Champions League

Play-off round

Squad information

Playing statistics

|-

|-
! colspan=16 style=background:#dcdcdc; text-align:center| Players transferred out during the season

Goalscorers
Includes all competitive matches. The list is sorted alphabetically by surname when total goals are equal.

Suspensions

Players

Players with Multiple Nationalities
   Ibrahim Majid
   Pedro Miguel
   Yasser Abubakar
   Ali Asad
   Ahmed Sayyar

Transfers

In

References

Al Sadd SC seasons
Qatari football clubs 2016–17 season